Argyrotaenia posticirosea is a species of moth of the family Tortricidae. It is found in Peru.

The wingspan is about 19 mm. The ground colour of the forewings is brown, suffused with blackish dorsally. The hindwings are rose-pink with a brown apex.

Etymology
The species name refers to the colouration of the hindwings and is derived from Latin posticus (meaning posterior) and rosea (meaning pink).

References

Moths described in 2010
posticirosea
Moths of South America